Delwyn Dean Stromer (April 22, 1930 – September 7, 2003) was an American politician who served in the Iowa House of Representatives from 1967 to 1991. He served as Speaker of the Iowa House for two years, from 1981 to 1982. Stromer was a member of the United States Army Reserve from  1951 to 1959, and served on active duty from 1953 to 1955. He died in 2003 at Mercy Medical Center in West Des Moines of cardiovascular disease complications.

References

External links

1930 births
2003 deaths
20th-century American politicians
Speakers of the Iowa House of Representatives
Republican Party members of the Iowa House of Representatives
United States Army reservists
United States Army soldiers
United States Army personnel of the Korean War
People from Garner, Iowa